The South River is a  river in eastern New Hampshire and western Maine in the United States. It is a tributary of the Ossipee River, which flows east to the Saco River and ultimately the Atlantic Ocean.

The South River begins at the outlet of Province Lake in the town of Effingham, New Hampshire, and proceeds north past the village of Center Effingham. Jogging east, the river enters Parsonsfield, Maine, then turns north again to reach the Ossipee River.

See also

List of rivers of New Hampshire

References

Rivers of New Hampshire
Rivers of Maine
Saco River
Rivers of York County, Maine
Rivers of Carroll County, New Hampshire